Csengele is a village in Csongrád County, in the Southern Great Plain region of southern Hungary.

Geography

References

Csengele